The 11D428A-16 (manufacturer's name RDMT-135M) is a liquid pressure-fed rocket engine burning N2O4/UDMH with an O/F of 1.85. It is used for crew-rated spacecraft propulsion applications. It is currently used in the KTDU-80 spacecraft propulsion module. The previous version, the 11D428A (manufacturer's name RDMT-135) is still used as the reaction control system thrusters of the Zvezda ISS module.
It is rated for 500,000 starts with a certified ignition time of 0.03 seconds to 2000 seconds. Each unit weights .

Versions
This engine has been used with certain variations in manned Russian space program since the Salyut 6 in Soviet times. The three main versions are:
 11D428: Delivered in 1970 for use in Salyut 1.
 11D428M: Version developed for the Yantar-2K platform. It reached space on the first launch, Kosmos 697 on August 6, 1974.
 11D428A (AKA RDMT-135): Version developed for the Soyuz 7K-S, it flew on Kosmos 670, Kosmos 772 and Kosmos 869. Later used on the KTDU-426.
 11D428A-10: Thruster used on the Zvezda ISS Module. Originally developed for the Mir Core Module.
 11D428A-14: Thruster used on the Zvezda ISS module.
 11D428A-16 (AKA RDMT-135M): Improved specific impulse version. Used on the KTDU-80 since Soyuz TM-28.
 11D428AF-16:Thruster version developed for the Fobos-Grunt planetary sample mission.

See also
KB KhIMMASH
KTDU-35
KTDU-80
Soyuz-T
Soyuz-TM

References

External links
 KB KhIMMASH Official Page (in Russian)

Rocket engines of Russia
Rocket engines of the Soviet Union
Rocket engines using hypergolic propellant
Rocket engines using the pressure-fed cycle
NIIMash rocket engines